Steven Holt (born January 28, 1958) is the Iowa State Representative from the 18th District.  A Republican, he has served in the Iowa House of Representatives since 2015.

References

1958 births
Living people
People from Crawford County, Iowa
Politicians from Greenville, South Carolina
Businesspeople from Iowa
Republican Party members of the Iowa House of Representatives
21st-century American politicians